Yakov Paparkov (born 6 February 1971) is a Bulgarian association football manager and former player who has served as the manager of Pirin Gotse Delchev.

He has played for numerous clubs in Bulgaria, including Etar 1924, Makedonska Slava, Minyor Pernik, Marek Dupnitsa, Belasitsa Petrich, Lokomotiv Rousse, Lokomotiv GO, and Pirin Gotse Delchev.

On 27 June 2011, Paparkov was confirmed as the new manager of Pirin Gotse Delchev replacing Ivan Atanasov. He guided the club to the A PFG in his first season.

References

External links
 

1971 births
Living people
Bulgarian football managers
Bulgarian footballers
FC Lokomotiv Gorna Oryahovitsa players
PFC Minyor Pernik players
PFC Marek Dupnitsa players
PFC Belasitsa Petrich players
PFC Pirin Gotse Delchev players
First Professional Football League (Bulgaria) players
Association footballers not categorized by position